Palmieri is an Italian surname. Notable people with the surname include:

Andrea Matteo Palmieri (1493–1537), Italian Roman Catholic bishop and cardinal
Davide Cocco Palmieri (1632-1711), Italian Roman Catholic Bishop of Malta 
Domenico Palmieri (1829–1909), Italian Jesuit scholastic theologian
Donato Palmieri (c. 1550–c. 1580), Italian painter of the late Renaissance period, also known as Donato da Formello
Francesco Palmieri (1659-1701), Italian poet and musician
Giuseppe Palmieri (1674-1740), Italian painter of the late Baroque period
Giuseppe Palmieri (1721-1793), Italian economist and politician
Pietro Palmieri, former Italian racing driver
Alessandro "Alex" Palmieri (born 1991), Italian singer, songwriter and LGBT activist
Charlie Palmieri (1927–1988), Puerto Rican-American pianist and bandleader
Eddie Palmieri  (born 1936), Puerto Rican-American pianist and bandleader
Edmund Louis Palmieri (1907–1989), United States District Judge 
Emerson Palmieri (born 1994), Brazilian-born Italian footballer
Ermanno Palmieri (1921-1982), Italian professional football player
Federico Palmieri (born 1995), Italian football player
Francesco Palmieri (born 1975), Italian retired footballer
Fulvio Palmieri (1903–1966), Italian screenwriter
Giovanni Palmieri (1906–unknown), Italian male tennis player
Giovanni Palmieri dos Santos (born 1989), Brazilian professional footballer 
Giuseppe Palmieri (1902-1989), Italian high jumper and javelin thrower 
Irma Palmieri (1931–2015), Venezuelan actress and comedian
Jennifer M. Palmieri (born 1966), former White House Director of Communications and Director of Communications 
Gerard Anthony Palmieri (born 1958), American football strength and conditioning coach
Julian Palmieri (born 1986), French professional footballer 
Kyle Palmieri (born 1991), American ice hockey player
Luigi Palmieri (1807–1896), Italian physicist and meteorologist
Mario Rubén García Palmieri (1927–2014), Spanish cardiologist 
Matteo Palmieri (1406–1475), Italian humanist and historian
Paul Palmieri (CEO) (born 1970), American entrepreneur
Paul Palmieri (Bickertonite) (born 1933), American religious leader
Riccardo Palmieri (born 1995), Italian footballer
Rubi Lira Miranda Palmieri (born 1983), Brazilian female water polo player 
Silvio Palmieri (1957–2018), Canadian composer
Stefano Palmieri (born 1964), Sammarinese politician, who served as a Captain Regent of San Marino together with Matteo Ciacci 
Victor Palmieri (born 1930), American lawyer, real estate financier and businessman
Wayan Palmieri (born 1977), American music video director, film editor and photographer

Fictional characters
Grace Palmieri
Marco and Giuseppe Palmieri, characters in Gilbert and Sullivan's The Gondoliers

See also
 Palmier (surname)

Italian-language surnames